Deh Now-e Sadat may refer to:
 Deh Now-e Sadat-e Bala
 Deh Now-e Sadat-e Pain
 Dehnow-ye Sadat-e Vosta